Wernerella may refer to:
 Wernerella (fungus),  a genus of fungi in the family Mycosphaerellaceae
 Wernerella (grasshopper), a genus of insects in the subfamily Oedipodinae